Grace Asantewaa (born 5 December 2000) is a Ghanaian professional footballer who plays as a defender for Spanish Primera División club Real Betis and the Ghana women's national team.

International career
Asantewaa competed for Ghana at the 2018 Africa Women Cup of Nations, playing in three matches.

International goals

References

2000 births
Living people
Ghanaian women's footballers
Women's association football defenders
EdF Logroño players
Primera División (women) players
Ghana women's international footballers
Ghanaian expatriate footballers
Ghanaian expatriate sportspeople in Spain
Expatriate women's footballers in Spain
Ghanaian expatriate women's footballers
Ampem Darkoa Ladies F.C. players
Ghana Women's Premier League players